General elections were held in Liberia in 1911. In the presidential election, the result was a victory for Daniel Edward Howard of the True Whig Party. He took office on 1 January 1912.

References

Liberia
1911 in Liberia
Elections in Liberia
Election and referendum articles with incomplete results